John Phillips (1839 or 1840 – 2 April 1917) was an Irish politician. He was the Nationalist Member of Parliament for South Longford.

Phillips was born in County Longford, and was a farmer there. As a young man he was a leader of the Fenian movement in Longford, but later devoted his energies to the constitutional Home Rule movement. He was co-opted to Longford County Council on its establishment in 1899, and was its chairman from 1902 until his death. He was elected as MP for South Longford in 1907.

He died at his home in Edgeworthstown after a long illness on 2 April 1917, aged 77.

References

1917 deaths
Members of the Parliament of the United Kingdom for County Longford constituencies (1801–1922)
UK MPs 1906–1910
UK MPs 1910
UK MPs 1910–1918
Irish Parliamentary Party MPs
Year of birth uncertain
Politicians from County Longford